Andrew or Andy Murray may refer to:

Scots of the Wars of Independence 
   
 Andrew Moray (justiciar) (died 1298), or Sir Andrew Murray of Petty, Justiciar of Scotia
 Andrew Moray (died 1297), or Sir Andrew Murray, leader of the Scots during the Scottish Wars of Independence, son of the above
 Andrew Murray (soldier) (1298–1338), Scots general of the 2nd Scottish War of Independence, Scottish head-of-state (Guardian of Scotland) twice; posthumous son of the above

Sport 
 Andy Murray (born 1987), Scottish tennis player
 Andy Murray (boxer) (born 1982), Irish professional boxer
 Andrew Murray (Guyanese boxer) (1971–2002), Guyanese boxer of the 1990s and 2000s
 Andrew Murray (golfer) (born 1956), English golfer 
 Andrew Murray (ice hockey) (born 1981), Canadian ice hockey player
 Andy Murray (ice hockey) (born 1951), Canadian ice hockey coach and former player

Other 
 Andrew Murray (Australian politician) (born 1947), Australian politician, former member of the Australian Senate
 Andrew Murray (children's writer) (born 1970), English children's writer
 Andrew Murray (doctor) (born 1980), Scottish doctor, runner and author who works for the Scottish Government
 Andrew Murray (journalist) (1813–1880), Australian journalist
 Andrew Murray (minister) (1828–1917), South African religious minister, missionary, and author  
 Andrew Murray (physiologist), lecturer in physiology, University of Cambridge
 Sir Andrew Murray (Scottish politician) (1903–1977), Lord Provost of Edinburgh
 Andrew Murray, 1st Lord Balvaird (1597?–1644), minister of the Church of Scotland and peer
 Andrew Murray, 1st Viscount Dunedin (1849–1942), Scottish politician and judge
 Andrew Murray (naturalist) (1812–1878), Scottish botanist and entomologist   
 Andrew F. Murray (1877–1932), New York assemblyman
 Andrew Murray (singer), Danish singer
 Andrew Murray (trade unionist) (born 1958), British trade union official and journalist; former member of the Communist Party of Britain
 Andrew Hunter Murray, British writer and podcaster
 Andrew W. Murray, American biologist
 R. Andrew Murray, American attorney